Kuršanec (before 1896 Kursanecz) is a village in Međimurje County, Croatia.

The village is located in the south-western part of Međimurje County, near Lake Varaždin, and is administratively part of the wider area of the county seat, Čakovec. The centre of the city is located around 9 kilometres from the village. The centre of Varaždin, the county seat of Varaždin County, is located approximately 7 kilometres from the village. The population of Kuršanec in the 2011 census was 1,584.

References

Populated places in Međimurje County